Henry Stratford Persse (1769–1833) was an Irish writer.

Persse was a younger son of the Persse family of Roxborough, and of the same family as Lady Gregory. Because he inherited not wealth or land estate, he was a Landwaiter of the Customs House in Galway for about twenty years before his death in 1833. He was married to Anne Sadleir and had twenty-two children. Ten of these survived infancy.

Of these, Richard, Dudley and Theophilus were sent by their father to America in 1821 with various siblings following after. Their correspondence has been edited and published, providing a valuable insight to the mindset of the Irish middle class in the early 19th century.

References
 The Persse Story: The Persse Family Letters - The Nineteenth Century, New Haven, Ms., privately printed, 1988.
 "Nothing But Misery All Around Me:" Henry Stratford Persse and the Galway Famine of 1822, James L. Pethica and James Charles Roy, eds, Journal of the Galway Archaeological and Historical Society, volume 47, 1995, pp. 1–35.
 "To The Land of the Free from this Island of Slaves" Henry Stratford Persse's Letters from Galway to America, 1821-1832, Pethica and Roy, Cork University Press, 1998.
 "I Prefer a Free Country" Letter To And From County Galway Emigrants 1843-1856, James Charles Roy, Journal of the Galway Archaeological and Historical Society, volume 56, 2004, pp. 85–153.

People from County Galway
1833 deaths
Year of birth unknown
1769 births